Thestieis (Greek: Θεστιείς) is a former municipality in Aetolia-Acarnania, West Greece, Greece. Since the 2011 local government reform it is part of the municipality Agrinio, of which it is a municipal unit. The municipal unit has an area of 75.058 km2. The seat of the Thestieis municipal unit is Kainourgio. It is situated at the northwestern shore of Lake Trichonida.

References

External links
Municipality of Thestieis 

Populated places in Aetolia-Acarnania